Jammu and Kashmir Infrastructure Development Finance Corporation (JKIDFC) Limited was formed in 2018 to speed-up pending, unfunded or languishing infrastructure development projects in Jammu and Kashmir. Some of the projects which JKIDFC is undertaking have been pending for 25 years old.

On 9 August 2020, it was announced the that "over 600 projects of immense public importance", projects which had been left languishing for up to 25 years, had been completed. These projects include extension/construction/widening of roads, bridges, water supply schemes and flats. Other major projects included development of industrial estates, healthcare infrastructure, entrepreneurship development institutes, sports infrastructure, education infrastructure and hand pumps across the region. In financial year 2019–20, over 1200 projects worth  were financed under JKIDFC.

References

Further reading 

 Memorandum And Articles Of Association of Jammu And Kashmir Infrastructure Development Finance Corporation P Limited (Archive)
 J&K: One Year Since Revocation of Special Status: RSTV- Big Picture

External links 

Government of Jammu and Kashmir
2018 establishments in Jammu and Kashmir
State financial corporations of India